Jack Blum is a Canadian writer, producer, director, story editor, actor, educator and communications consultant based in Toronto, Ontario, Canada. With his longtime partner Sharon Corder, he has written and produced more than fifty hours of television drama for both Canadian and American broadcasters.

His early acting career included the role of "Spaz" in the comedy hit Meatballs, as well as appearances in dozens of other feature films and television shows.

In the theatre, he directed productions across Canada (including several world premieres) and was associate artistic director at the La Jolla Playhouse in California. He has written many articles about the film industry for periodicals (Take one, Montague, POV), taught courses in screenwriting, and been an advocate for Canadian cinema and culture.

He has worked as a communications consultant for several prominent Canadian politicians.  Since 1998, he has served as chair of the Credit Arbitration Committee of the Writers Guild of Canada.

Biography

Early life and education
Born in Toronto, Ontario, Blum grew up in Hamilton, Ontario, and trained as an actor at the National Theatre School of Canada.

Career
On graduating from NTS he appeared in many feature films and television shows, including most notably Meatballs.
In the early Eighties, Blum began writing for television.  In addition to episodes of the series Sons and Daughters and The Edison Twins, he co-wrote and was Associate Producer on the television movie Hockey Night, starring Megan Follows and Rick Moranis, for the Canadian Broadcasting Corporation, and the award-winning short drama The Umpire for the National Film Board of Canada.
In 1985 he began working with co-writer Sharon Corder.  Together they co-created the celebrated and long-running series Traders, as well as a host of other episodes of television drama.  They were Story Editors on the syndicated series Catwalk, Co-Producers on Traders (Global), and Supervising Producers on Power Play (CTV).

In 1998 they wrote and produced a feature film, Babyface (directed and co-written by Blum, produced and co-written by Corder), which premiered at the Director’s Fortnight in Cannes in 1998.

In 2003, the team produced a short drama, DNA, with Corder scripting and Blum directing. The film stars Michael Riley as a grieving widower struggling to get over his loss.

In 2005, he and Corder founded Reel Canada, an educational program that introduces high school students and new Canadians to Canadian film. In 2014, the organization launched National Canadian Film Day, an annual one-day celebration of Canadian film that features more than 1000 screenings across Canada and around the world.

Filmography

Movies

Television

For Kids’ Records, Blum also scripted and directed the children’s audio tape A Child's Look at - What it Means to be Jewish, and, with Corder, A Child's look at - Mozart.

Awards

The Umpire:  	First Prize at the Festival of the Humanities, San Francisco
			Blue Ribbon, American Film Festival, New York
Hockey Night:   	C.F.T.A. Award, Best Feature Length Production
			ACTRA Award Nominee; Best  Original Screenplay,
			ACTRA Award Nominee;  Best Children's Program
What it Means to be Jewish:  Best Spoken Word Recording,
			National Independent American Distributors Award, San Francisco
Getting out:	Dora Mavor Moore Award for Artistic Excellence and Theatrical Innovation

References

External links

Year of birth missing (living people)
Living people
Canadian male film actors
Canadian male screenwriters
Male actors from Toronto
Writers from Toronto
Canadian television producers
Canadian theatre directors
20th-century Canadian screenwriters
20th-century Canadian male writers